The Springfield Model 1816 was a .69 caliber flintlock musket manufactured in the United States during the early 19th century.

History
The War of 1812 had revealed many weaknesses in American muskets. The Springfield Model 1812 was created in an attempt to improve both the design and manufacture of the musket. The Model 1816 made further improvements, and replaced the Model 1812. The Model 1812 had borrowed heavily from the design of the French Charleville Model 1777, and this design was retained for the Model 1816. The Model 1816 had a 42-inch (107 cm) long .69 caliber smoothbore barrel, similar to the Model 1812, but had a longer lock plate, a shorter trigger guard, and a longer bayonet than the Model 1812. The Model 1816 also had a more straight lined stock. The overall length of the weapon was 58 inches (147 cm).

The Model 1816 musket was originally manufactured at the Springfield and Harpers Ferry armories along with independent contractors between 1816 and 1844. Around 700,000 were made, more than any other flintlock in U.S. history.

The Model 1816 was originally manufactured as a flintlock musket. Like many flintlock muskets, many of these were later converted to percussion cap, as the percussion cap system was much more reliable and weather resistant. Some also had their barrels rifled as well.

This model of Springfield musket was used by Texans during the Texas Revolution and by the U.S. Army and militia during the Mexican–American War. During this conflict, the flintlock version of the Model 1816 was preferred by U.S. regular forces, due to percussion cap supply concerns.

It was also used during the early years of the American Civil War until around 1862. The large majority of Model 1816 muskets had been converted to percussion firing by 1860. Muskets made prior to 1821 were considered too outdated to be serviceable weapons and were not converted. Most of them were in Southern arsenals and a large number of Confederate soldiers for the first year of the Civil War had the misfortune of carrying flintlock muskets, some of which dated back to the War of 1812.

Many improvements to the Model 1816 were made, producing the Springfield Model 1822, Springfield Model 1835, Springfield Model 1840, and Springfield Model 1842. U.S. Ordnance Department referred to these as different models, but in other U.S. government documents they are referred to as a continuation of the Model 1816 with the first model designated as the Type I, the Model 1822 as the Type II, and the Model 1835 as the Type III. Modern histories are similarly inconsistent in the nomenclature of these weapons.

See also
 Springfield musket

References

External links

Springfield firearms
Muskets
American Civil War weapons
Weapons of the Confederate States of America